Oswald James Hawken (1870–1957) was a Reform Party Member of Parliament in New Zealand, and was a cabinet minister 1926–1928 in the Reform Government.

He was elected to the Egmont electorate in the 1919 general election, but was defeated in 1928.

In 1935, he was awarded the King George V Silver Jubilee Medal.

References

1870 births
1957 deaths
Reform Party (New Zealand) MPs
Members of the Cabinet of New Zealand
Members of the New Zealand House of Representatives
New Zealand MPs for North Island electorates
Unsuccessful candidates in the 1928 New Zealand general election